In astrophysics, a polytrope refers to a solution of the Lane–Emden equation in which the pressure depends upon the density in the form

The constant  is known as the polytropic index; note however that the polytropic index has an alternative definition as with n as the exponent.

This relation need not be interpreted as an equation of state, which states P as a function of both ρ and T (the temperature); however in the particular case described by the polytrope equation there are other additional relations between these three quantities, which together determine the equation. Thus, this is simply a relation that expresses an assumption about the change of pressure with radius in terms of the change of density with radius, yielding a solution to the Lane–Emden equation.

Sometimes the word polytrope may refer to an equation of state that looks similar to the thermodynamic relation above, although this is potentially confusing and is to be avoided. It is preferable to refer to the fluid itself (as opposed to the solution of the Lane–Emden equation) as a polytropic fluid. The equation of state of a polytropic fluid is general enough that such idealized fluids find wide use outside of the limited problem of polytropes.

The polytropic exponent (of a polytrope) has been shown to be equivalent to the pressure derivative of the bulk modulus where its relation to the Murnaghan equation of state has also been demonstrated. The polytrope relation is therefore best suited for relatively low-pressure (below 107 Pa) and high-pressure (over 1014 Pa) conditions when the pressure derivative of the bulk modulus, which is equivalent to the polytrope index, is near constant.

Example models by polytropic index

An index  polytrope is often used to model rocky planets. The reason is that  polytrope has constant density, i.e., incompressible interior. This is a zero order approximation for rocky (solid/liquid) planets.
A polytrope with index  is a good model for fully convective star cores (like those of red giants), brown dwarfs, giant gaseous planets (like Jupiter). With this index, the polytropic exponent is 5/3, which is the heat capacity ratio (γ) for monatomic gas. For the interior of gaseous stars (consisting of either ionized hydrogen or helium), this follows from an ideal gas approximation for natural convection conditions.
A polytrope with index  is also a good model for white dwarfs of low mass, according to the equation of state of non-relativistic degenerate matter.
A polytrope with index  is a good model for the cores of white dwarfs of higher masses, according to the equation of state of relativistic degenerate matter.
A polytrope with index  is usually also used to model main-sequence stars like the Sun, at least in the radiation zone, corresponding to the Eddington standard model of stellar structure. 
A polytrope with index  has an infinite radius. It corresponds to the simplest plausible model of a self-consistent stellar system, first studied by Arthur Schuster in 1883, and it has an exact solution.
A polytrope with index  corresponds to what is called an isothermal sphere, that is an isothermal self-gravitating sphere of gas, whose structure is identical to the structure of a collisionless system of stars like a globular cluster. This is because for an ideal gas, the temperature is proportional to ρ1/n, so infinite n corresponds to a constant temperature.

In general as the polytropic index increases, the density distribution is more heavily weighted toward the center of the body.

References

See also 
 Polytropic process
 Equation of state
 Murnaghan equation of state

Astrophysics

de:Polytrop